Eldorado is an EP released only in Japan and Australia by Neil Young backed by The Restless, which consisted of Chad Cromwell and Rick Rosas.

It contains different mixes of three songs that subsequently appeared on Young's 1989 album Freedom, "Don't Cry," "On Broadway," and "Eldorado," and two tracks not available on any other recording, "Cocaine Eyes" and "Heavy Love."

The "Don't Cry" track on Eldorado is longer than the later version published on Freedom, for which some of the more free-form guitar work was edited out (at the insistence of co-producers Niko Bolas and Frank Sampedro).

Track listing
All songs written by Neil Young, except "On Broadway" (Barry Mann, Cynthia Weil, Jerry Leiber, Mike Stoller).
"Cocaine Eyes" – 4:24
"Don't Cry" – 5:00
"Heavy Love" – 5:09
"On Broadway" – 4:57
"Eldorado" – 6:03

Personnel
Neil Young – guitar, vocals
Chad Cromwell – drums
Rick "The Bass Player" Rosas – bass
Frank "Poncho" Sampedro – guitar on "Eldorado"

Notes
Chad Cromwell and Rick Rosas also provided rhythm on 1989's Freedom, 2005's Prairie Wind, 2006's Living with War and 2009's Fork in the Road studio albums.

Charts

References

External links

1989 EPs
Neil Young EPs
Reprise Records EPs
Albums produced by Neil Young
Albums produced by Frank Sampedro